The Gatineau LRT is a planned  light rail system proposed by the Ville de Gatineau to be located in Gatineau, Quebec as well as Ottawa, Ontario. The system will be operated by Société de transport de l'Outaouais (STO), Gatineau's public transportation service. The system is planned to begin operation in 2028. The Ville de Gatineau is looking to the Government of Quebec to fund 60 percent of the project and for the Canadian federal government to fund 40 percent of the project, though neither have yet committed to funding the project.

Project updates 
In February 2023, the NDP backed the projected and called upon Prime Minister Justin Trudeau and the Liberal Party of Canada to pledge the necessary funding.

Gatineau proposals

All tram
The tram would feature two lines and termini on Boulevard des Allumettières: one intersecting with Chemin Eardley in the Aylmer district, and another with Chemin Vanier in the Plateau district. An interchange station at Alexandre-Taché and Saint-Raymond would allow riders to switch between the Aylmer and Plateau lines.

Aylmer trams from Eardley would travel east on des Allumettières until reaching Wilfrid-Lavigne, then south until reaching Rue Principale, then eastbound on Chemin Alymer before reaching the interchange. Plateau trams from Vanier would travel north until reaching Boulevard du Plateau, then travel east until the road finishes at Saint-Raymond, then southbound before reaching the interchange.

The main tram service in Gatineau would run from Boulevard Alexandre-Taché, where it would reach the existing Saint-Dominique park and ride and Taché-UQO Rapibus station, to Rue Laurier. The main line would either serve as the eastern portion of one of the district lines, or operate separately as a third line.

Plateau LRT
Plateau service from the all tram stations would be maintained until the Saint-Raymond and du Plateau intersection. From there, eastbound service would continue on des Allumettières and serve the Montcalm Rapibus station, then continue on des Allumettières until reaching Boulevard Maisonneuve, near the Canadian Museum of History. Trams would then travel southbound on Maisonneuve before reaching Portage Bridge for the Ottawa segment. Service in Aylmer would be limited to Boulevard des Allumettières, with trains travelling from Chemin Vanier to the line's sole terminus on Chemin Eardley. This scenario does not require an interchange in Gatineau. Bus rapid transit would provide service on Wilfrid-Lavigne and from Rue Principale to Rue Laurier, including the Taché-UQO Rapibus station.

Aylmer LRT
Aylmer service and main service from the all tram stations would be entirely maintained, while Plateau service from the Plateau LRT station would be entirely replaced with bus rapid transit.

Ottawa proposal
The eastern terminus of the system would be in Ottawa near Lyon Station, allowing riders to connect with the Confederation Line, with alternative plans having it terminate further east in Ottawa. The system would cross the river over the Portage Bridge. Although early plans called for the LRT to travel across the Prince of Wales Bridge and the Alexandra Bridge, the Portage Bridge was later identified as the best crossing for the LRT by a study conducted for STO by engineering firm WSP Global. An analysis showed that connecting the system to Ottawa across the Prince of Wales Bridge would have overwhelmed Bayview Station, its originally planned terminus. The Ottawa section is planned to run along Wellington Street or through a tunnel beneath Sparks Street. According to a survey of Ottawa and Gatineau residents conducted by STO, 60% of respondents preferred the tunnel option. On November 16, 2020, Ottawa's transportation committee granted approval for the Spark Street tunnel to be built for the Gatineau LRT, while still leaving the Wellington option open as a possibility. On August 13, 2021, the National Capital Commission endorsed the idea of the tramway running down Wellington Street.

Loop proposal
A group known as 'Supporters of the Loop' have proposed the creation of a rail transit loop between the downtowns of Ottawa and Gatineau which the Gatineau LRT would connect into. The loop would run along Wellington Street in Ottawa, turn north on an undetermined street (possibly Mackenzie Avenue, Sussex Drive or Dalhousie Street), cross the Ottawa River on the Alexandra Bridge, run along Laurier Street in Gatineau, before connecting back to Ottawa via the Portage Bridge. The group's supporters include former Ottawa mayors Jim Durrell, Jacquelin Holzman, and Larry O’Brien. Ottawa mayor Jim Watson has said that while it is an interesting idea, his own priority is to build Stage 3 of the O-Train. On November 16, 2020, Ottawa's transportation committee passed a motion requesting the federal government provide funds for a feasibility study on the transit loop and on having Wellington Street converted into a pedestrian mall.

References

External links
STO's consultation page for the system's integration into Ottawa

Proposed railway lines in Canada
Rapid transit in Canada
Transport in Gatineau
Rail transport in Ottawa
2028 in rail transport